Haim Sabato is an Israeli rabbi and author.

Biography
Haim Sabato was born to a family of Aleppan-Syrian descent in Cairo. In the 1950s, his family immigrated to Israel and lived in a "ma'abara" (transit camp) in Kiryat HaYovel, Jerusalem. He studied at a Talmud Torah in Bayit Vegan, in the vicinity, and after it attended the "Netiv Meir" yeshiva-high school, also in Bayit Vegan. Rabbi Aryeh Bina, Rosh Yeshiva of "Netiv Meir", was one of his key influences.

After graduation, he joined the "Hesder" program at Yeshivat Hakotel, in the old city of Jerusalem, which combines yeshiva studies with military service. His experiences during the Yom Kippur war, at the age of 21, led him to write Adjusting Sights.

After the war, Sabato spent the next few years at Yeshivat Mercaz Harav, the spiritual home of religious Zionism. After receiving rabbinical ordination, Sabato co-founded Yeshivat Birkat Moshe in Ma'aleh Adumim, near Jerusalem, in 1977.

Literary style
Sabato's lyrical writing, with sentences studded with phrases drawn from, and referring to, passages in the Bible and Talmud has won him numerous fans and made him a symbol of the "pitfalls" of translating literary works form one language to another. He has published four novels in addition to Rabbinical works.

Published works
Sabato's first book, Emet Mi Eretz Titzmach, (published in English as Aleppo Tales), is a collection of short stories relating to his family's ancestral home and community of Aleppo, Syria.

Sabato was awarded the Sapir Prize for Literature in its inaugural year, as well as the Yitzhak Sadeh Prize, for his second work, Teum Kavanot (Adjusting Sights in the English translation), a moving account of the experiences of a soldier in the Yom Kippur war. The book has also been made into a film.

His third publication, Ke-Afapey Shachar (published in English as Dawning of the Day: A Jerusalem Tale), tells the story of Ezra Siman Tov, a religious Jerusalemite coming to terms with a changing world.

Sabato's next work, Boyi Ha-Ruach (published in English as From the Four Winds),  describes his experiences as an "oleh chadash" (a new immigrant) in the Israeli "ma'abarot" (typical transit camps of the 1950s).

In his most recent book, Be-Shafrir Chevyon, Sabato returns again to his childhood in "Beit Mazmil", Jerusalem, as a newcomer, with memories from Cairo intermingling with adventures in the monastery of Ein-Karem, and the annual Independence Day exhibition in Jerusalem. Again we meet both the Piutim (religious poetry) and Torah study that dominate Sabato's spiritual world, along with his Yom Kippur War memories, all tied together in a constant search of God, Who often hides from the human eye, when the latter needs him most.

Works translated into English

 Adjusting Sights
  Aleppo Tales
  The Dawning of the Day: A Jerusalem Tale
  From the Four Winds

References

1952 births
Religious Zionist Orthodox rabbis
People from Jerusalem
Israeli settlers
Jewish writers
Living people
Egyptian emigrants to Israel
Israeli Orthodox rabbis
Mercaz HaRav alumni
Israeli male short story writers
Israeli short story writers
Israeli novelists
Recipients of Prime Minister's Prize for Hebrew Literary Works